McColl may refer to:

 McColl, South Carolina
 McColl Center for Art + Innovation, an artist residency and contemporary art space in Charlotte, North Carolina.
 McColl (surname)
 McColl (superfund site), a US Environmental Protection Agency Superfund site in California.

See also
 MacColl